Lucian Cojocaru (born 21 December 1952) is a Romanian former sports shooter. He competed in the skeet event at the 1972 Summer Olympics.

References

1952 births
Living people
Romanian male sport shooters
Olympic shooters of Romania
Shooters at the 1972 Summer Olympics
Place of birth missing (living people)